Danglas, officially the Municipality of Danglas, Municipal District of Danglas, is a 5th class municipality in the province of Abra, Philippines. According to the 2020 census, it has a population of 4,074 people.

Geography
According to the Philippine Statistics Authority, the municipality has a land area of  constituting  of the  total area of Abra.

Climate

Barangays
Danglas is politically subdivided into 7 barangays. These barangays are headed by elected officials: Barangay Captain, Barangay Council, whose members are called Barangay Councilors. All are elected every three years.

Demographics

In the 2020 census, Danglas had a population of 4,074.

Economy 

The economy of the municipality is heavily dependent on agriculture particularly palay, corn, vegetables and fruits. Other raw materials include rattan and bamboos.

Government
Danglas, belonging to the lone congressional district of the province of Abra, is governed by a mayor designated as its local chief executive and by a municipal council as its legislative body in accordance with the Local Government Code. The mayor, vice mayor, and the councilors are elected directly by the people through an election which is being held every three years.

Elected officials

References

External links

 [ Philippine Standard Geographic Code]

Municipalities of Abra (province)